ST11261 (1974) was the sixth album released by Brewer & Shipley.

The album's title refers to its Capitol Records catalog number, a device previously used by Peter, Paul & Mary (Album 1700, 1967), and which would later be used for albums released by Dave Davies (AFL1-3603, 1980) and Yes (90125, 1983).

Stephen Stills's band Manassas recorded Brewer's song "Bound to Fall" for their 1972 debut album, two years in advance of its appearance on ST11261.

Track listing
all songs Brewer & Shipley except where marked

Side A
"Fair Play" (Steve Canaday)  – 4:53
"It Did Me In" (Mark Baysinger)  – 2:43
"Look Up, Look Out"   – 2:55
"Shine So Strong" (Mike Brewer)  – 3:05
"How Are You"  – 3:55

Side B
"Eco-Catastrophe Blues"  – 3:15
"Keeper Of The Keys"  – 3:52
"Bound To Fall" (Mike Brewer, Tom Mastin) – 2:15
"Oh So Long"  – 2:25
"Ballad of a Country Dog" (Mike Brewer)  – 4:50

Personnel
Mike Brewer - vocals, guitars
Tom Shipley - vocals, guitars
Gary Mallaber & Russ Kunkel - drums
 Larry Knight- Jesse Ed Davis - electric guitars
John Boylan - keyboards
Doug Haywood - bass
Sneaky Pete Kleinow - pedal steel guitar

1974 albums
Brewer & Shipley albums
Albums produced by John Boylan (record producer)
Capitol Records albums